Pedro Díaz Ramos (born 1910), also listed as Pablo Diaz, is a Cuban former baseball catcher and first baseman in the Negro leagues. 

A native of Bauta, Cuba, Díaz played from 1930 to 1935 with several teams, including the Cuban Stars (East), Cuban Stars (West), the Pollock's Cuban Stars, and the New York Cubans. He also played with Caguas in the Puerto Rican Winter League in 1939 and 1940.

References

External links
 and Baseball-Reference Black Baseball stats and Seamheads

Date of birth missing
Cuban baseball players
New York Cubans players
Cuban Stars (West) players
Cuban Stars (East) players
Pollock's Cuban Stars players
People from Bauta, Cuba